Ceralocyna venusta is a species of beetle in the family Cerambycidae. It was described by Martins & Galileo in 2010.

References

Ceralocyna
Beetles described in 2010